The 1989–90 BYU Cougars men's basketball team represented Brigham Young University as a member of the Western Athletic Conference during the 1989–90 basketball season. Led by first-year head coach Roger Reid, the Cougars compiled a record of 21–9 (11–5 WAC) to finish second in the WAC regular season standings. The team played their home games at the Marriott Center in Provo, Utah, and finished with an unblemished record at home (16–0). The Cougars received an at-large bid to the NCAA tournament, making their first appearance under Reid. In the NCAA tournament, BYU lost a tough opening round game to Clemson, 49–47.

Roster

Schedule and results

|-
!colspan=9| Regular Season

|-
!colspan=9| WAC Tournament

|-
!colspan=9| NCAA Tournament

References

BYU Cougars men's basketball seasons
Byu
Byu